Claudio "Tripa" Barrientos (born November 10, 1935 in Osorno — died May 7, 1982) was a Chilean boxer, who won the bronze medal in the bantamweight (119.5 pounds) division at the 1956 Summer Olympics in Melbourne, Australia. A year earlier he won the silver medal at the Pan American Games. His nickname was Tripa. Barrientos died at age 46.

Olympic results
1st round bye
Defeated Zenon Stefaniuk (Poland) points
Defeated Eder Jofre (Brazil) points
Lost to Song Soon-Chun (South Korea) points

References

1935 births
1982 deaths
Olympic boxers of Chile
Boxers at the 1956 Summer Olympics
Olympic bronze medalists for Chile
People from Osorno, Chile
Olympic medalists in boxing
Chilean male boxers
Medalists at the 1956 Summer Olympics
Pan American Games silver medalists for Chile
Pan American Games medalists in boxing
Boxers at the 1955 Pan American Games
Bantamweight boxers
Medalists at the 1955 Pan American Games
20th-century Chilean people